Isaiah Luna Potts (1784?-after 1843) was infamous in legend and lore for having run a 19th-century Illinois tavern known as "Potts Inn" where numerous crimes including robbery and murder were committed.

Early life
Isaiah Luna Potts was born in Loudoun County, Virginia, and lived in Union County, Kentucky and Potts Hill, in Hardin County, Illinois, which was formerly a part of Pope County, Illinois.

In legend and folklore
In legend and folklore, he was known by many names and aliases including "Billy Potts, Sr." Potts was an Illinois tavern keeper and salt maker who, allegedly, co-led a gang of highwaymen and murderers, known as the "Potts Hill Gang", out of his tavern. They preyed along the frontier crossroad highways, and the Ford's Ferry Road, near Cave-In-Rock. Isaiah Potts was also alleged to be the criminal partner of James Ford, a pillar of the local community, and secretly, the criminal leader of the Ford's Ferry Gang.

Notable Potts Hill Gang members
Dr. King (first name unknown)
Nysonger (first name unknown)
Billy Potts Sr. (possible gang member)
Billy Potts Jr. (possible gang member)

References

 Allen, John W.  It Happened in Southern Illinois.  Carbondale, IL:  Southern Illinois University Press, 2010.
 Allen, John W.  Legends and Lore of Southern Illinois.  Carbondale, IL:  Southern Illinois University Press, 2010.
 Botkin, B.A.  A Treasury of Mississippi River Folklore.  New York:  Crown Publishers, Inc., 1955.
 Carr, William R.  Isaiah L. Potts (Billy Potts, Sr.) and Polly Blue of Potts Hill (Potts Inn)
 Lewicki, James, ed.  The Life Treasury of American Folklore.  New York:  Time, Incorporated, 1961.
 Musgrave, Jon.  Slaves, Salt, Sex & Mr. Crenshaw: The Real Story of the Old Slave House and America's Reverse Underground R.R..  www.illinoishistory.com, 2005.
 Musgrave, Jon. The Legend of Billy Potts and Potts' Tavern
 Musgrave, Jon.  Potts Hill Gang, Sturdivant Gang, and Ford's Ferry Gang Rogue's Gallery, Hardin County in IllinoisGenWeb.  Springfield, IL:  The Illinois Gen Web Project, 2018.
 Rothert, Otto A.  The Outlaws of Cave-In-Rock. 1924 (1996).  
 Sniveley Jr., W. D. and Louanna Furbee.  Satan's Ferryman: A True Tale of the Old Frontier.  New York: Frederick Ungar Publishing Co., 1968.
 Warren, William Penn.  Poem, "Ballad of Billie Potts."  
 Wellman, Paul I.  Spawn of evil: the invisible empire of soulless men which for a generation held the Nation in a spell of terror.  Doubleday, 1964.
 Federal Writers' Project.  The WPA Guide to Illinois: The Prairie State.  San Antonio, TX:  Trinity University Press, (1930-1940) 2013.
 History of Union County, Kentucky. Buffalo, NY:  Courier Company, Printers, 1886 (1967).

External links
Potts Hill Gang, Sturdivant Gang, and Ford's Ferry Gang Rogue's Gallery, Hardin County in IllinoisGenWeb

Drinking establishment owners
Crime families
American outlaws
19th-century American criminals
Outlaw gangs in the United States
People from Loudoun County, Virginia
People from Hardin County, Illinois
People from Union County, Kentucky